Phalaris is the eleventh studio album by Japanese heavy metal band Dir En Grey, released on June 15, 2022 via Firewall Div./SMEJ.

Background 
Phalaris is the first album in 4 years since The Insulated World, and marks the 25th anniversary of the band's formation. Re-recorded versions of two earlier singles "Mazohyst of Decadence" (from Gauze) and "Ain't Afraid to Die" are included exclusively for the limited edition bonus CD of this release.

The title and artwork for Phalaris is inspired by the ancient tyrant Phalaris and the torture device he invented, the Brazen bull, "in which victims were roasted alive. An internal mechanism was said to distort the screams of the victims into the cries of cattle."

A music video for "Perfume of Sins" was released on June 14, 2022, "just two hours before midnight of the album's official release on June 15."

A Blu-ray/DVD that has included live recordings taken from performances in Shinkiba Studio Coast in Kōtō, Tokyo, Japan on January 26 and 27, 2022 (additional show), will be released in support of Phalaris, titled The Final Days of Studio Coast. A series of online live events to celebrate the release of the album has been scheduled for July 1, 2, 3, and 18, 2022.

Critical reception
The album received positive reviews from JRock News and rockin'on.com.

Track listing

Personnel
Dir En Grey
  – lead vocals
  – guitars, programming
 Die – guitars
 Toshiya – bass
 Shinya – drums

Charts

References

2022 albums
Dir En Grey albums
Japanese-language albums